Małgorzata Rosiak (born 8 September 1977) is a Polish snowboarder. She competed in the women's giant slalom event at the 1998 Winter Olympics.

References

1977 births
Living people
Polish female snowboarders
Olympic snowboarders of Poland
Snowboarders at the 1998 Winter Olympics
Sportspeople from Gliwice
20th-century Polish women